This is a season-by-season list of records compiled by Ferris State in men's ice hockey.

Ferris State has made four NCAA Tournament appearances in its history, reaching the championship game in 2012.

* Winning percentage is used when conference schedules are unbalanced.† Ferris State was still considered an NAIA program in their first year of NCAA play.‡ Dick Bertrand resigned in January after a 10–11–1 start.

Footnotes

References

 
Lists of college men's ice hockey seasons in the United States
Ferris State Bulldogs ice hockey seasons